XHRTM-FM is a radio station on 99.5 FM in Macuspana, Tabasco. It carries a grupera format known as La Z.

History
XEPT-AM 620 received its concession on October 6, 1960, originally to be located at Ciudad Pemex. By 1970, it was owned by Fausto Aguilar Saldivar and broadcast from Macuspana with 1,000 watts on 1150 kHz. The current concessionaire acquired it in 2003 and moved it to 850 kHz with 5,000 watts day and 1,000 night.

XERTM was approved to migrate to FM on June 4, 2010, becoming XHRTM-FM 107.7. XHRTM-FM moved to 99.5 MHz in 2018 in order to clear 106-108 MHz for community and indigenous stations, as a condition of its concession renewal.

External links
La Z Mascupana Twitter

References

Radio stations in Tabasco